The Little Waswanipi River is a tributary of the south bank of the Opawica River. It flows northeast in the municipality of Eeyou Istchee Baie-James (municipality) in the administrative region of Nord-du-Québec, in Quebec, in Canada.

The course of the "Little Waswanipi River" crosses the townships of Boyvinet and Ghent. The route 113 linking Lebel-sur-Quévillon and Chibougamau passes through the valley of the "Little Waswanipi River".

The surface of the "Little Waswanipi River" is usually frozen from early November to mid-May, however, safe ice movement is generally from mid-November to mid-April.

Geography

Toponymy
The toponym Petite rivière Waswanipi was formalized on November 1, 1988 in Commission de toponymie du Québec.

Notes and references

See also 

Rivers of Nord-du-Québec
Nottaway River drainage basin
Eeyou Istchee James Bay